Places in Cities is a 1998 German drama film directed by Angela Schanelec. It was screened in the Un Certain Regard section at the 1998 Cannes Film Festival.

Cast
In alphabetical order
 Sophie Aigner as Mimmi
  as Yves
 Katharina Eckerfeld as Mimmi's Girlfriend (as Katie Eckerfeld)
 Martin Jackowski as Christoph
 Friederike Kammer as Mimmi's Mother
 
 Jérôme Robart as Nicolas
 
  as The Man (as Mischa Sideris)

References

External links

1998 films
German drama films
1990s German-language films
1998 drama films
Films directed by Angela Schanelec
1990s German films